Tricondylomimus coomani  is the type species in its genus of praying mantids of the family Iridopterygidae.

References

External links 

Gonypetidae
Insects of Southeast Asia
Insects described in 1930